Straftaten gegen die öffentliche Ordnung – Gegen ein Verbot von Action-Computerspielen was a successful German petition launched on June 5, 2009, meant to reverse a government plan to ban violent games from the country. The German government eventually reversed its decision and sided with the gamers.

Background 
A "string of unrest in Germany over violence in video games" prompted the German government to work on a bill to ban violent video games. In June 2009, "the country's 16 interior ministers asked the Bundestag to ban the creation and distribution of games involving violent acts against human or human-like characters. Government criticism of video games had been growing since a school shooting in March was linked to online-shooter Counter-Strike". This plan drew ire from the German gaming community, which resulted in an online petition to challenge the German government decision.

The petition itself reads (in an English translation):

Aftermath 
The e-petition eventually reached 73,000 signatures, prompting a government review. Officials have stated that the German government will focus on "educating citizens about the country's USK game ratings standard", instead of changing the current legislation. The creator of the 73,000-signature petition was actually allowed by the government to speak in front of the country's Committee on Petitions and he "argued that banning violent games would be a misstep, and that further education on games and the media would be a better goal for Germany".

Coverage 
The reversal of the violent video game ban was covered by major gaming media, such as Joystiq, GamePolitics, Destructoid, 1UP and even mainstream media, such as The Guardian.

See also 

 Video games in Germany
  – pejorative German-language term for video games featuring violence against human/humanoid characters

References 

Violence in video games
Censorship in Germany
Video game controversies
Video game censorship
Online petitions